Amiya Kumar Dasgupta (16 July 1903 – 14 January 1992) (অমিয় কুমার দাশগুপ্ত) was an Indian economist who has been described as "one of the founding fathers of modern economics in India" and "a true pioneer in developmental economics". He was the father of the economists Sir Partha Dasgupta. and Alaknanda Patel.

Early life and education 

Dasgupta was born in Bhanga, Faridpur district, East Bengal, Bengal Presidency, British India (now Bangladesh). His childhood was spent in Goila, a village in Barisal district.

Dasgupta obtained his Matriculation degree from Goila School (established in 1883 by his uncle, Rajanikanto Dasgupta) in 1920; his Intermediate degree from the Brojomohun College, Barisal, East Bengal, 1922, which was then affiliated with the University of Calcutta. He earned his B.A. and M.A. degrees in economics in 1925 and 1926 respectively as a student of the University of Dacca.

Between 1926 and 1946 Dasgupta was a lecturer in economics at Dacca University. On leave from his lectureship, he worked for a PhD in economics under Lionel Robbins at the London School of Economics in 1934–1936, being awarded his Ph.D. in 1936 for a dissertation with the title, "The Conception of Surplus in Theoretical Economics" (published in India during the war as a book). He was later elected Honorary Fellow there in 1978.

Among the earliest members of the Hindu diaspora from what is now Bangladesh, Dasgupta and his wife, Shanti, and their two children, Alakananda and Partha, migrated to Delhi in 1946. Apart from brief appointments abroad (Chief of the South Asia Division, International Monetary Fund, 1950–53; Commonwealth Visiting Fellow, University of Cambridge, 1963–64), he remained in India.

Dasgupta died on 14 January 1992 at Shantiniketan, India.

Economic work 

Dasgupta is widely acknowledged to have been India's leading economic theorist in the decades 1930-60 (he published a number of seminal articles and books on economic theory and the history of economic thought) and a pioneer in contemporary development economics. In his obituary, the Nobel Laureate Amartya Sen wrote, "(Dasgupta) was one of the true pioneers of development economics. He had also made substantial contributions to the history of economic ideas, and in particular to analyzing the diverse perspectives of alternative traditions of economic reasoning and their interconnections. He has important publications in at least a dozen other areas in economics ...".

Dasgupta was also a renowned teacher (among his students: S.R. Sen, Ashok Mitra, and Amartya Sen). In his obituary piece, Sen goes on to write, "... Dasgupta was a great teacher who could make the subject come alive with imagination, wit, lucidity, and a quality that I can only describe as astute compassion."

Dasgupta was one of the founders, in 1949, of the internationally known journal The Economic Weekly (current name, Economic and Political Weekly). He was President of the Indian Economic Association in 1959. In 2009 his collected works were published by Oxford University Press in three volumes (Two Treatises on Classical Political Economy (Vol. I), Essays in Economic Theory (Vol. II), and Essays in Planning and Public Policy (Vol. III)), compiled and edited by his daughter, Alaknanda Patel.

In 1955, Professor A. K. Dasgupta was part of the Panel of Economists advising on the Second Five Year Plan.

Professional affiliations 

1926-46: Lecturer, Dacca University
1946-47: Senior Lecturer, Sri Ram College of Commerce
1947: Professor, Ravenshaw College
1947-58: Professor, Banaras Hindu University
1955: Member, Panel of Economists, Second Five Year Plan
1958-61: Deputy Director General, National Council of Applied Economic Research, New Delhi
1961-65: Professor, Indian School of International Studies
1965-71: Director, A.N. Sinha Institute of Social Studies, Patna
1970-73: Member, Third Pay Commission of India
1976-82: Honorary Professor, Jawaharlal Nehru University

Selected publications 

 "Keynesian Economics and Underdeveloped Countries", Economic Weekly, January 1954 (reprinted on his birth centenary in Economic and Political Weekly 2003, Vol. 38, No. 28, pp. 2919–2922)
 Planning and Economic Growth (George Allen & Unwin, 1965)
 The Economics of Austerity (Oxford University Press, 1975)
 Epochs of Economic Theory (Basil Blackwell, 1985)
 The Collected Works of A.K. Dasgupta, Volume I: Two Treatises on Classical Political Economy, edited by Alaknanda Patel (Oxford University Press, 2009)
 The Collected Works of A.K. Dasgupta, Volume II: Essays in Economic Theory, edited by Alaknanda Patel (Oxford University Press, 2009)
 The Collected Works of A.K. Dasgupta, Volume III: Essays in Planning and Public Policy, edited by Alaknanda Patel (Oxford University Press, 2009)

References

1903 births
1992 deaths
University of Calcutta alumni
University of Dhaka alumni
Alumni of the London School of Economics
Academic staff of the University of Dhaka
Academic staff of Delhi University
Academic staff of Banaras Hindu University
20th-century Indian economists